Garbon or Gorban may refer to:
 Gorban, Qasr-e Qand
 Garbon, Saravan